SunVox, also known as SunVox Modular Music Creation Studio, is a music creation tool built around the SunVox Engine, a software-based modular synthesizer and tracker-based sequencer. It is available for multiple platforms including Windows, MacOS, Linux on the desktop and iOS, Android in the mobile sphere. The desktop versions are freely available for download on the developer's website while a paid version for iOS and Android apps, respectively, is purchasable from those platforms' official app stores. There was also, at one time, a release for Palm OS devices.

The underlying SunVox engine was developed as free software under the BSD License prior to version 1.4.

Features

Commentary 

The website TapeOp.com had the following to say, with respect to the program's interface:"There are a lot of things about the interface that will probably be counter intuitive to someone coming from a more conventional DAW environment but if you've ever used and enjoyed a tracker you will feel right at home, and if you haven't you will find that once you're familiar with some tracker sequencing conventions SunVox has a very efficient work flow with a good balance between depth and usability."

To some, SunVox offers hope for music production on Android devices, as detailed herein:
"Android would be almost a useless platform for music, except that Android runs SunVox perfectly and then you don’t need any other apps. That’s six bucks well spent. And it’s on iOS, too. And free on macOS, Windows, Linux, and … you’ve got some old Windows CE device? Don’t create toxic waste. Run SunVox."

Version History

References

External links

 SunVox website
 Voices of the Sun (original blog)
 Reddit community
 SunVox Guide project GitHub)
 SunVox Module Library

Modular synthesizers